Sir Henry Edney Conrad Cain   (2 December 1924 – 17 January 2008) was a Belizean accountant who dedicated 51 years of his life as a public servant. He was knighted in 1986 by Queen Elizabeth II and received the award of "Order of Distinguished Service" in 2006. He is recognized as a renowned Belizean because of his contribution to the stabilizing of Belize's high liquidity and payment problems in 1987 through which he rebuilt Belize's foreign reserves.

Education
Sir Edney Cain began his education attending Ebenezer Primary School followed by St. George's College and St. Michael's College. He furthered his studies in 1953 and 1954 by taking courses in accountancy and audit in the United Kingdom at his own expense. He continued his professional training by receiving a certificate after sitting the Association of Certified & Corporation Accountant's Intermediate Examinations in 1954. Not stopping there, he continued his studies later receiving several accounting certificates; one being certification from the Association of Certified Corporate Accountant of the Carleton University in Ottawa, Canada.

Government service
Sir Edney Cain began his service with the Government of Belize in 1940, at the age of 16, as a messenger at the Wireless Station and continued serving the government, climbing the organizational ladder. He became the first governor of the Central Bank of Belize in 1982, and, in 1984, he began his career as an ambassador and he held that title multiple times until 1990. His most significant contribution to the government was in 1987 when he joined the Ministry of Finance becoming the Financial Secretary. 

This was a challenging time for Belize because of severe liquidity and payment problems that Belize was experiencing. At this time Belize was also in the middle of a Structural Adjustment Program with the International Monetary Fund. Cain resolved these problems within a period of 2 years in which he also rebuilt the foreign reserves. He continued serving the Government of Belize until he retired in December 1991.

Posts held
 Messenger at the Wireless Station, 1940
 Supernumerary Probationer and Junior clerk, 1942
 Third Class Clerk, 1945
 Second Class Clerk, 1946
 First Class Clerk at the Audit Department, 1953
 Examiner of Accounts and Sr. Examiner of Accounts, 1955
 Auditor in the Audit Department, 1959
 Assistant Accountant General, 1961
 Accountant General, 1963
 On special assignment to the Ministry of Finance and Economic Development, 1970
 First Managing Director of the Belize Monetary Authority, 1976
 First Governor of the Central Bank, 1982-1983
 Belize's first resident ambassador to the United States of America 1984
 Belize's non-resident High Commissioner to Canada, 1984
 Financial Secretary of the Ministry of Finance, 1987
 Belize's resident High Commissioner to the United Kingdom and Ambassador to France, Germany, Belgium and the Vatican, 1987–1990
 Governor of the Central Bank, 1991

Honors
 Appointed a Member of the Order of the British Empire (MBE) in 1965
 Appointed an Officer of the Order of the British Empire (OBE) in 1975
 Knighted by Queen Elizabeth II in 1986
 Received the award of "Order of Distinguished Service" at Belize's 25th anniversary of Independence in 2006.
 On June 26, 2008 the New Administration Building in Belmopan was renamed to the "Sir Edney Cain Building" in his honor of being such a large contributor to the financial stability of Belize.

Literature
 Collection of poems written in 1948 entitled When the Angel Says "Write"!.
 In 1925, he assisted Monrad Siegfried Metzgen in writing The Handbook of British Honduras which comprises historical, statistical and general information concerning the colony of British Honduras, now Belize.

Death
After battling cancer for eight years, Sir Edney Cain passed away at the age of 83 in his home in Belmopan on 17 January 2008. Five days later, a state funeral was held for him at the Wesley Methodist Church in Belize City.

References

1924 births
2008 deaths
People from Belmopan
Governors of Bank of Belize
Ambassadors of Belize to the United States
Officers of the Order of the British Empire
Knights Bachelor